The following lists events that happened during 2006 in Ethiopia.

Incumbents
President: Girma Wolde-Giorgis
Prime Minister: Meles Zenawi

Events

February
 February 6 - UNICEF Emergency Program Director, Dan Toole, said that 56,000 children are suffering from moderate and severe malnutrition as a result of current drought.
 February 22 - The trial date of 80 individuals accused of treason, genocide, and outrages against the Constitution relating to demonstrations last October, has been set for Thursday. The defendants include elected parliamentary members and leading members of the Coalition for Unity and Democracy, journalists, and human rights activists.

August
 August 6 - The Dechatu River floods, killing over 200 people.
 August 16 - The death toll for the floods reach over 300.

December
 December 8 - The Somali and Ethiopian militaries engage the Islamic Court Union inside Somalia.
 December 24 - Ethiopia has confirmed that its troops have invaded and are fighting Islamic militiamen that control much of Somalia.

References

 
Years of the 21st century in Ethiopia
2000s in Ethiopia
Ethiopia
Ethiopia